Peter Watts (born January 25, 1958) is a Canadian science fiction author.  He specializes in hard science fiction.  He earned a Ph.D from the University of British Columbia in Vancouver, British Columbia in 1991, from the Department of Zoology and Resource Ecology.  He went on to hold several academic research and teaching positions, and worked as a marine-mammal biologist.  He began publishing fiction around the time he finished graduate school.

Career
His first novel Starfish (1999) reintroduced Lenie Clarke from his short story, "A Niche" (1990); Clarke is a deep-ocean power station worker physically altered for underwater living and the main character in the sequels: Maelstrom (2001), βehemoth: β-Max (2004) and βehemoth: Seppuku (2005). The last two volumes constitute one novel, but were published separately for commercial reasons. Starfish, Maelstrom, and βehemoth make up a trilogy usually referred to as "Rifters" after the modified humans designed to work in deep-ocean environments.

His novel Blindsight, released in October 2006, was nominated for a Hugo Award. The novel has been described by Charles Stross as follows: "Imagine a neurobiology-obsessed version of Greg Egan writing a first contact with aliens story from the point of view of a zombie posthuman crewman aboard a starship captained by a vampire, with not dying as the boobie prize."  Echopraxia (2014) is a "sidequel" about events happening on Earth and elsewhere concurrent with the events in Blindsight.

Watts has made some of his novels and short fiction available on his website under a Creative Commons license. He believes that doing so has "actually saved [his] career outright, by rescuing Blindsight from the oblivion to which it would have otherwise been doomed. The week after [he] started giving Blindsight away, sales tripled."

In addition to writing novels and short stories, Watts has also worked in other media. He was peripherally involved in the early stages of the animated science fiction film and television project Strange Frame. He also worked briefly with Relic Entertainment on one of the early drafts of the story that would eventually, years later, become Homeworld 2. However, the draft Watts worked on bears no resemblance to the one used for the released game. More recently, he has been recruited by Crytek as a writer and art consultant on Crysis 2. Technological elements from Blindsight have been referenced in the fictional Crysis 2 "Nanosuit Brochure"; the creative director of BioShock 2 has cited Watts's work as an influence on that game.

Personal life
Watts obtained a Bachelor of Science degree in 1980 and a Master of Science degree in 1983, both from the University of Guelph, Ontario.  He obtained his Ph.D from the University of British Columbia in Vancouver, British Columbia, from the Department of Zoology and Resource Ecology, in 1991.

In December 2009, Watts was detained at the Canada–United States border by U.S. Customs and Border Protection (CBP) to perform a reportedly random search of the rental vehicle he was driving. Watts is alleged to have assaulted a CBP Officer and was turned over to local authorities to face charges. According to an officer, the authorities used pepper spray to subdue Watts after Watts became aggressive toward officers. According to Watts, he was assaulted, punched in the face, pepper-sprayed, and thrown in jail for the night. The officer later admitted in court that he had punched Watts. A jury found Watts guilty of obstructing a U.S. Customs and Border Protection officer. He faced a maximum sentence of 2 years in prison. Watts blogged about his sentence saying that because of how the law was written, his asking, "What is the problem?", was enough to convict him of non-compliance. In April 2010, he was given a suspended sentence and a fine. However, due to immigration laws, Watts' felony conviction prevents him from re-entering the United States.

In February 2011, he contracted the rare disease necrotizing fasciitis in his leg, which he has blogged about on his website.

He married fellow Canadian author Caitlin Sweet in August 2011.

Bibliography

Novels

Rifters trilogy

 Starfish (July 1999, Tor Books)
 Maelstrom (October 2001, Tor Books)
 βehemoth (published in two volumes):
 βehemoth: β-Max (July 2004, Tor Books)
 βehemoth: Seppuku (December 2004, Tor Books)

Firefall
 Blindsight (October 2006, Tor Books)
 Echopraxia (August 2014, Tor Books)
 Firefall (August 2014, Head of Zeus). Omnibus edition of Blindsight and Echopraxia.

Other
 Crysis: Legion (released on 22 March 2011. Novelization of the video-game Crysis 2)
 Peter Watts Is an Angry Sentient Tumor: Revenge Fantasies and Essays (November 12, 2019, Tachyon Publications)

Collections
 Ten Monkeys, Ten Minutes (November 2002, Tesseract Books)
 Beyond the Rift (2013)

Short stories, novelettes, and novellas

Sunflower cycle
The Sunflower series of stories concerns the voyage of a jumpgate-building ship named Eriophora:

"The Island" (The New Space Opera 2, 2009)
"Hotshot" (Reach for Infinity, 2014)
"Giants" (Clarkesworld Magazine, September 2014)
 The Freeze-Frame Revolution (2018, Tachyon Publications)
"Hitchhiker" (2018, story fragment, published online. Link was in The Freeze-Frame Revolution)
"Strategic Retreat" (2021, story fragment, published online)

The chronological order within the Sunflower universe is: "Hotshot", The Freeze-Frame Revolution, "Giants", "The Island", "Hitchhiker".

Others
"A Niche" (Tesseracts, 1990)
"Nimbus" (On Spec, 1994)
"Flesh Made Word" (Prairie Fire Magazine, 1994)
"Fractals" (On Spec, 1995)
"Bethlehem" (Tesseracts 5, 1996)
"The Second Coming of Jasmine Fitzgerald" (Divine Realms, 1998)
"Home" (On Spec, 1999)
"Bulk Food" (On Spec, 2000) with Laurie Channer
"Ambassador" (Ten Monkeys, Ten Minutes, 2002)
"A Word for Heathens" (ReVisions, 2004)
"Mayfly" (Tesseracts 9, 2005) with Derryl Murphy
"Repeating the Past" (Nature Magazine, 2007)
"The Eyes of God" (The Solaris Book of New Science Fiction: Volume 2, 2008)
"Hillcrest v. Velikovsky" (Nature Magazine, 2008)
"The Things" (Clarkesworld Magazine, January 2010)
"Malak" (Engineering Infinity, edited by Jonathan Strahan, December 2010)
"Firebrand" (Twelve Tomorrows, 2013)
"The Colonel" (Tor.com, 29 July 2014)
"Collateral" (Upgraded, 2014)
"Colony Creature" (2015)
"ZeroS" (Infinity Wars, edited by Jonathan Strahan, September 2017)
"Kindred" (Infinity's End, edited by Jonathan Strahan, July 2018)
"Gut Feelings" (Toronto 2033, November 2018)

Awards and critical reception

"A Niche"
 Winner 1992 Prix Aurora Award (tied with Breaking Ball by Michael Skeet)

Starfish
 Nominee 2000 Campbell Award

Blindsight
 Nominee 2007 Hugo Award for Best Novel
 Nominee 2007 Campbell Award
 Nominee 2007 Locus Award for Best SF Novel
 Winner 2008 SFinks Prize (by Polish SF-oriented quarterly magazine SFinks) for Best Non-Polish Language Novel
 Shortlisted 2010 Geffen Award
 Winner 2014 Tähtivaeltaja Award
 Winner 2014 Seiun Award for Best Translated Novel

"The Island"
Winner 2010 Hugo Award for Best Novelette
Nominee 2010 Theodore Sturgeon Memorial Award
Nominee 2010 Locus Award for Best Novelette

"The Things"
Finalist 2010 Parsec Award for Best Speculative Fiction Story (Short Form)
Nominee 2010 BSFA Award for Best Short Story
Winner 2010 Shirley Jackson Award for Best Short Story
Nominee 2011 Hugo Award for Best Short Story
3rd Place 2011 Theodore Sturgeon Memorial Award
Finalist 2011 Locus Award for Best Short Story

References

External links
 
 
 
  

Canadian science fiction writers
Canadian biologists
Canadian male novelists
Canadian male short story writers
Living people
1958 births
21st-century Canadian short story writers
21st-century Canadian male writers
Creative Commons-licensed authors